Haesun Park is a professor and chair of Computational Science and Engineering at the Georgia Institute of Technology. She is an IEEE Fellow, ACM Fellow, and Society for Industrial and Applied Mathematics Fellow. Park's main areas of research are Numerical Algorithms, Data Analysis, Visual Analytics and Parallel Computing. She has co-authored over 100 articles in peer-reviewed journals and conferences.

Education
Park graduated in 1981 from Seoul National University with a bachelor's degree in mathematics, and went on to graduate studies in computer science at Cornell University, earning a master's degree in 1985 and a Ph.D. in 1987 under the supervision of Franklin Tai-Cheung Luk.

Career
Park started her teaching career at the University of Minnesota as Assistant Professor and later became Associate Professor in the university. From 1998 to 2005, she was a professor in the department of computer science and engineering at the University of Minnesota. Park was a program director at the National Science Foundation from 2003 until 2005, before moving to Georgia Tech in 2005. She has also held an affiliation with the Korea Institute for Advanced Study since 2008. Park led the Foundations of Data and Visual Analytics (FODAVA) center and received $3 million grant to support emerging field of massive data analysis and visual analytics. Currently, she serves on the Data Analytics Selection Committee of SDM/IBM (SIAM Data Mining) and was a member of SIAM Fellow Selection Committee from 2015 to 2017. Park was named chair of the School of Computational Science and Engineering at Georgia Tech in 2020.

In 2013 she became a fellow of the Society for Industrial and Applied Mathematics "for contributions to numerical analysis and the data sciences". In 2020, she became a fellow of the Association for Computing Machinery (ACM) "for contributions to numerical algorithms, data analytics, and leadership in computational science and engineering." Parks also sits on the editorial board of BIT Numerical Mathematics, and International Journal of Bioinformatics Research and Applications. Parks also plays leadership roles in: International Journal of Bioinformatics Research and Applications, SDM, IEEE Transactions on Pattern Analysis and Machine Intelligence, BIT Numerical Mathematics and others. She was granted the patent for Method and apparatus for high dimensional data visualization with three others.

Other work

 2004–Present: Founding editorial board member, International Journal of Bioinformatics Research and Applications
 2010-2014: Editorial board member, IEEE Transactions on Pattern Analysis and Machine Intelligence
 2004-2010: Editorial board member, Society for Industrial and Applied Mathematics
 2002-2009: Editorial board member, BIT Numerical Mathematics
 1999-2005: Editorial board member, American Mathematical Society
 1993-1999: Editorial board member, SIAM Journal on Scientific Computing

Selected publications

References

External links

Year of birth missing (living people)
Living people
American computer scientists
20th-century South Korean mathematicians
South Korean women mathematicians
20th-century American mathematicians
21st-century American mathematicians
American women computer scientists
American women mathematicians
Seoul National University alumni
Cornell University alumni
University of Minnesota faculty
Georgia Tech faculty
Fellows of the Society for Industrial and Applied Mathematics
Fellow Members of the IEEE
20th-century women mathematicians
21st-century women mathematicians
20th-century American women
21st-century American women